The Lion Mountains (also called Lioness Mountains or Peninsula Mountains, originally from ) are a mountain range in Sierra Leone. The range stretches  on the Freetown Peninsula by the Atlantic Ocean, southeast of the capital,  Freetown. The mountains are part of the Western Area Forest Reserve, a nature reserve with a hunting ban, established in 1916.

The Lion Mountains lie isolated on the coast of the Atlantic, and are surrounded by sea and lowlands in all directions. Being the only significant coastal mountains between Morocco and Cameroon, the Lion Mountains were a striking feature to the early European explorers. 

The republic of Sierra Leone is named after the range. The Portuguese explorer Pedro de Sintra named in 1462 the mountains Serra Leoa (Lioness Mountains). At a later point in time, Italian cartographers consulted the Italian explorer Alvise Cadamosto about the name of the mountains. He referred to them as Sierra Leone in his own language, and since then the Italian name has been used.

References

Mountain ranges of Sierra Leone